Pathogen-associated molecular patterns (PAMPs) are small molecular motifs conserved within a class of microbes, but not present in the host. They are recognized by toll-like receptors (TLRs) and other pattern recognition receptors (PRRs) in both plants and animals.  This allows the innate immune system to recognize pathogens and thus, protect the host from infection.

Although the term "PAMP" is relatively new, the concept that molecules derived from microbes must be detected by receptors from multicellular organisms has been held for many decades, and references to an "endotoxin receptor" are found in much of the older literature. The recognition of PAMPs by the PRRs triggers activation of several signaling cascades in the host immune cells like the stimulation of interferons (IFNs) or other cytokines.

Common PAMPs 
A vast array of different types of molecules can serve as PAMPs, including glycans and glycoconjugates. Flagellin is also another PAMP that is recognized via the constant domain, D1 by TLR5. Despite being a protein, its N- and C- terminal ends are highly conserved, due to its necessity for function of flagella. Nucleic acid variants normally associated with viruses, such as double-stranded RNA (dsRNA), recognized by TLR3 or unmethylated CpG motifs, recognized by TLR9. The CpG motifs must be internalized in order to be recognized by TLR9. Viral glycoproteins, as seen in the viral-envelope, as well as fungal PAMPS on the cell surface or fungi are recognized by TLR2 and TLR4.

Gram-Negative Bacteria 
Bacterial lipopolysaccharides (LPSs), also known as endotoxins,are found on the cell membranes of gram-negative bacteria, are considered to be the prototypical class of PAMPs. The lipid portion of LPS, lipid A, contains a diglycolamine backabone with multiple acyl chains. This is the conserved structural motif that is recognized by TLR4, particularly the TLR4-MD2 complex. Microbes have two main strategies in which they try to avoid the immune system, either by masking lipid A or directing LPS towards an immunomodulatory receptor.

Peptidoglycan (PG) is also found within the membrane walls of gram-negative bacteria and is recognized by TLR2, which is usually in a heterodimer of with TLR1 or TLR6.

Gram-Positive Bacteria 
Lipoteichoic acid (LTA) from gram-positive bacteria, bacterial lipoproteins (sBLP), a phenol soluble factor from Staphylococcus epidermidis, and a component of yeast walls called zymosan, are all recognized by a heterodimer of TLR2 and TLR1 or TLR6. However, LTAs result in a weaker pro-inflammatory response compared to lipopeptides, as they are only recognized by TLR2 instead of the heterodimer.

History 
First introduced by Janeway in 1989, PAMP was used to describe microbial components that would be considered foreign in a multicellular host. The term "PAMP" has been criticized on the grounds that most microbes, not only pathogens, express the molecules detected; the term microbe-associated molecular pattern (MAMP), has therefore been proposed. A virulence signal capable of binding to a pathogen receptor, in combination with a MAMP, has been proposed as one way to constitute a (pathogen-specific) PAMP.  Plant immunology frequently treats the terms "PAMP" and "MAMP" interchangeably, considering their recognition to be the first step in plant immunity, PTI (PAMP-triggered immunity), a relatively weak immune response that occurs when the host plant does not also recognize pathogenic effectors that damage it or modulate its immune response.

In mycobacteria 
Mycobacteria are intracellular bacteria which survive in host macrophages. The mycobacterial wall is composed of lipids and polysaccharides and also contains high amounts of mycolic acid. Purified cell wall components of mycobacteria activate mainly TLR2 and also TLR4. Lipomannan and lipoarabinomannan are strong immunomodulatory lipoglycans. TLR2 with association of TLR1 can recognize cell wall lipoprotein antigens from Mycobacterium tuberculosis, which also induce production of cytokines by macrophages. TLR9 can be activated by mycobacterial DNA.

See also 
 DAMP
 Tissue remodeling

References

Further reading 

 

Immune system